John G. Willacy (November 10, 1859 – September 19, 1943) was a Texas Democratic politician. Willacy is the namesake of Willacy County, Texas, after he introduced a bill to form the new county out of parts of Cameron and Hidalgo counties.

John Willacy, farmer and legislator, was born in Louisville, Kentucky, in 1859. He moved to Texas in 1892 and settled in the Corpus Christi area as a truck farmer. From 1899 to 1914 he was a member of the Texas legislature, where he served in the House of the Twenty-sixth and Twenty-seventh legislatures and in the Senate of the Twenty-eighth through the Thirty-third. He was chairman of committees on finance and internal improvements and served on committees on judicial districts and stock raising. Willacy was perhaps best known as the author of the bill providing for county local option, which is the ability of local political jurisdictions, typically counties or municipalities, to allow decisions on certain controversial issues based on popular vote within their borders. In practice, it usually relates to the issue of alcoholic beverage sales, which in the 1920s and 30s was a controversial issue, especially as prohibition in the United States was in effect. In 1911 Willacy introduced a bill to form a new county out of parts of Cameron and Hidalgo counties, and the resulting new county was named in his honor. He moved from Corpus Christi to San Antonio in 1912, and in the early 1920s was state tax commissioner under Governor Pat Morris Neff. Willacy died in San Antonio on September 19, 1943, and was buried in San José Cemetery. He was survived by his widow, Cordelia, and two daughters.

References

1859 births
1943 deaths
Politicians from Louisville, Kentucky
19th-century American politicians
20th-century American politicians
Democratic Party members of the Texas House of Representatives
Democratic Party Texas state senators
Tax commissioners
Farmers from Kentucky
Farmers from Texas